Byaga Point (‘Nos Byaga’ \'nos 'bya-ga\) is the ice-covered point on the northeast coast of Velingrad Peninsula projecting 1 km into the head of Barilari Bay on Graham Coast in Graham Land, Antarctica, formed by an offshoot of Ilchev Buttress.  The point is named after the settlement of Byaga in Southern Bulgaria.

Location
British mapping in 1976.

Maps
 Antarctic Digital Database (ADD). Scale 1:250000 topographic map of Antarctica. Scientific Committee on Antarctic Research (SCAR). Since 1993, regularly upgraded and updated.
British Antarctic Territory. Scale 1:200000 topographic map. DOS 610 Series, Sheet W 66 64. Directorate of Overseas Surveys, Tolworth, UK, 1976.

References
 Bulgarian Antarctic Gazetteer. Antarctic Place-names Commission. (details in Bulgarian, basic data in English)
Byaga Point. SCAR Composite Antarctic Gazetteer.

External links
 Byaga Point. Copernix satellite image

Headlands of Graham Land
Bulgaria and the Antarctic
Graham Coast